The Hyrum First Ward Meetinghouse is a historic meetinghouse of the Church of Jesus Christ of Latter-day Saints in Hyrum, Utah. It was built in 1903, and designed in the Gothic Revival style by architect Karl C. Schaub. It has been listed on the National Register of Historic Places since February 15, 1980.

References

Churches completed in 1903
Churches on the National Register of Historic Places in Utah
Gothic Revival church buildings in Utah
Meetinghouses of the Church of Jesus Christ of Latter-day Saints in Utah
National Register of Historic Places in Cache County, Utah
1903 establishments in Utah